Jolly Mukherjee is an Indian singer. Known as India's "King of Strings", Mukherjee specializes specifically in the music of Bollywood, or the Indian film industry. He started his career as a backup singer for commercials, then moving on to writing music for airline on-flight introductions, where he sometimes wrote for British Airways. His Longtime friend and a great singer Hariharan has been a great influence. His roots include a mixture of Hindustani classical music and Western music. It was Hariharan who actually gave him his first arrangement, HAZIR, which was an album with Ustad Zakir Hssain. Jolly Has been associated with Hariharans Ghazal arrangement, for the albums like Gulfam, Paigham, Jashn, Dil Ki Baat, Kaash, Waqt par Bolna, and Hazir 2. Also Reflection and Horizon to mention as associate.  He is known for working with the Madras Cinematic Orchestra, for his International Album, Fusebox, included remixes from State of Bengal and Badmarsh & Shri, from which the remixed version of "Bhatiyali" achieved success. He has a series of hit songs from the Hindi movies Dayavan, Sahibaan, Chandni, Saathi, Aaina, Sangeet, Aatish, Raghuveer, Aadmi, Aar Ya Paar, Judge Mujrim, Indrajeet, Bhishma, Raaz, Jungs, and Dhoom 2, to name a few.  He is famous in Bangladesh for providing playback for veteran actor Dipjol. One of his famous songs in Dhallywood is Ki batti lagaili (ore o mainka).  He provided the string arrangements for the Icelandic performer Björk's song "Verandi".

He was revered for Sahibaan Meri Sahibaan from movie Sahibaan, was a super-hit Romantic Melody. Anuradha Paudwal was his co-singer in this performance.

He is participating in Jjhoom India, a reality show on Sahara One, teamed up with Shama Sikander.

Recent projects include Detective Naani (film directed and co-produced by Romilla Mukherjee). He was the music director and producer for the same.

Discography

References 

Indian male singer-songwriters
Indian singer-songwriters
Participants in Indian reality television series
Living people
1977 births